Moose Range is a hamlet in Saskatchewan.

Unincorporated communities in Saskatchewan
Moose Range No. 486, Saskatchewan